Eurypetalum unijugum is a species of plant in the family Fabaceae. It is found only in Cameroon. Its natural habitat is subtropical or tropical moist lowland forests. It is threatened by habitat loss.

References

Detarioideae
Flora of Cameroon
Vulnerable plants
Taxonomy articles created by Polbot